Ernest James Renshaw (3 January 1861 – 2 September 1899) was a British tennis player who was active in the late 19th century.

Together with his twin brother William Renshaw, Ernest won the men's doubles at Wimbledon five times. He also won the singles championship at Wimbledon once, in 1888 and was inducted into the International Tennis Hall of Fame in 1983. He won the singles title at the Irish Championships on four occasions (1883, 1887, 1888, 1892). Ernest was the older of the brothers by 15 minutes and half an inch taller.

The boom in popularity of the game during the 1880s due to the modern tennis style of the Renshaw brothers became known as the 'Renshaw Rush'.

Death
He died of the effects of carbolic acid, but evidence could not prove whether it had been taken intentionally or not.

In 1983, Ernest Renshaw was elected posthumously into the International Tennis Hall of Fame together with his brother. In 2020, a street in Leamington Spa was named after his brother and him, Renshaw Drive.

Grand Slam finals

Singles (1 title, 4 runners-up)

Doubles (5 titles)

Performance timeline

Events with a challenge round: (WC) won; (CR) lost the challenge round; (FA) all comers' finalist

(OF) only for French club members

References

External links
 
 

1861 births
1899 deaths
19th-century English people
19th-century male tennis players
British male tennis players
International Tennis Hall of Fame inductees
Sportspeople from Leamington Spa
People from Waltham St Lawrence 
Wimbledon champions (pre-Open Era)
Twin sportspeople
English twins
Grand Slam (tennis) champions in men's singles
Grand Slam (tennis) champions in men's doubles
Tennis people from Warwickshire